Magno Damasceno Santos da Cruz (born May 20, 1988) is a Brazilian footballer who plays as a midfielder for Jiangxi Beidamen.

References

External links
 
 

1988 births
Living people
Brazilian footballers
Brazilian expatriate footballers
Association football midfielders
Campeonato Brasileiro Série A players
Campeonato Brasileiro Série B players
Esporte Clube Vitória players
Joinville Esporte Clube players
Cruzeiro Esporte Clube players
CR Flamengo footballers
CR Vasco da Gama players
Esporte Clube Bahia players
Ceará Sporting Club players
Clube Atlético Bragantino players
Jeju United FC players
Umm Salal SC players
Espérance Sportive de Tunis players
Cerezo Osaka players
Atlético Clube Goianiense players
Clube de Regatas Brasil players
Tianjin Jinmen Tiger F.C. players
Jiangxi Beidamen F.C. players
K League 1 players
J2 League players
Qatar Stars League players
China League One players
Expatriate footballers in Portugal
Expatriate footballers in Tunisia
Expatriate footballers in Japan
Expatriate footballers in South Korea
Expatriate footballers in Qatar
Expatriate footballers in China
Brazilian expatriate sportspeople in Portugal
Brazilian expatriate sportspeople in Tunisia
Brazilian expatriate sportspeople in Japan
Brazilian expatriate sportspeople in South Korea
Brazilian expatriate sportspeople in Qatar
Brazilian expatriate sportspeople in China
Sportspeople from Salvador, Bahia